Gabriela Sabatini was the defending champion but did not compete that year.

Steffi Graf won in the final 6–2, 6–0 against Manuela Maleeva.

Seeds
A champion seed is indicated in bold text while text in italics indicates the round in which that seed was eliminated.

  Steffi Graf (champion)
  Pam Shriver (semifinals)
  Manuela Maleeva (final)
  Claudia Kohde-Kilsch (quarterfinals)
  Lori McNeil (semifinals)
  Sylvia Hanika (quarterfinals)
  Sandra Cecchini (quarterfinals)
  Nathalie Tauziat (quarterfinals)

Draw

External links
 1988 Brighton International draw

Women's Singles
Singles